Angelica Wallén (born 11 April 1986) is a former Swedish handball player for the Swedish women's national handball team.

At the 2010 European Women's Handball Championship she reached the final and won a silver medal with the Swedish team.

She competed at the 2012 and 2016 Summer Olympics.

Achievements 
Swedish Championship:
Winner: 2008, 2022
Danish Championship:
Winner: 2021
Danish Cup:
Winner: 2019, 2020
Carpathian Trophy: 
Winner: 2015

References

External links 
 
 
 

1986 births
Living people
Swedish female handball players
Olympic handball players of Sweden
Handball players at the 2012 Summer Olympics
Handball players at the 2016 Summer Olympics
Swedish expatriate sportspeople in Denmark
Swedish expatriate sportspeople in France
Expatriate handball players
People from Sundsvall
Sportspeople from Västernorrland County